George Aloysius Carrell, S.J. (June 13, 1803—September 25, 1868) was an American prelate of the Roman Catholic Church who served as the first bishop of the Diocese of Covington, Kentucky from 1853 until his death in 1868.

Early life and education
George Carrell was born in Philadelphia, Pennsylvania, on June 13, 1803. His grandfather, Timothy Carrell, was a native of Ireland and came to the United States before the Revolutionary War, establishing himself as a grocer on Water Street in Philadelphia. His father, John Carrell, was a native of Philadelphia, and his mother, Mary Julia Moore, was a native of Lancaster. The seventh of eight children, he was born and raised in the former mansion of William Penn, at the corner of Market Street and Letitia Court. Having received elementary instruction in the schools of his native city, he was sent in 1813, when only ten years old, to Mount St. Mary's College in Emmitsburg, Maryland, where he spent three years. In 1816 he entered Georgetown College, where he pursued his collegiate course for four years.

He next entered the novitiate of the Society of Jesus at White Marsh. At the end of two years thus spent, he returned to his family, with whom, however, he spent but a short time. He did not lose sight of his chosen vocation, and soon afterward entered the Theological Seminary of St. Mary's in Baltimore. Here he was a schoolmate of several who afterwards became distinguished in ecclesiastical history, including Samuel Eccleston. He again entered Mount St. Mary's College, where he continued his theological studies under Dr. Simon Bruté.

Priesthood
Having completed his studies, Carrell was ordained to the priesthood in December 1827, at St. Augustine's Church in Philadelphia by Bishop Henry Conwell. For six years he labored on the mission, serving as a curate at St. Augustine's and attending to a mission in New Jersey. He was next appointed pastor of Holy Trinity Church in Philadelphia. His next mission was in Wilmington, Delaware, from which place he also attended West Chester and New Castle. In all these positions he proved himself a laborious priest and a good pastor, winning for himself not only the high esteem and friendship of Bishop Francis Patrick Kenrick, but also the kind regard of the entire population, including great numbers of other denominations, especially of the Religious Society of Friends at Philadelphia. At Wilmington his ministry was especially useful. Here he established two schools—one a boarding and day school for young ladies in charge of the Sisters of Charity, and the other a school for boys.

After this experience of missionary life, he felt a renewal of his early desire for the life of a religious order, and resolved to join the Society of Jesus, in which he had spent two years of noviceship in his youth. Before doing so, however, he spent some weeks assisting the pastors of St. Augustine's in Philadelphia and of St. Paul's Church in Pittsburgh. In 1835 he applied for and received admission into the Society of Jesus in their Province of St. Louis, Missouri—first as a novice at Florissant, and two years afterwards as a scholastic at St. Louis. He was soon appointed a professor in Saint Louis University, and afterwards pastor of the College Church of St. Francis Xavier in 1837, rector of Saint Louis University from 1843 to 1847. In 1847, he was transferred to Cincinnati and assigned to St. Xavier Preparatory School. and President of Purcell Mansion College for young boys near Cincinnati, Ohio, from 1851 to 1853.

Episcopacy
The First Plenary Council of Baltimore, which opened on May 9, 1852, recommended the erection of the Diocese of Covington, embracing the eastern portion of Kentucky—until then forming part of the Diocese of Louisville—and proposed Carrell as its first Bishop. The Holy See, by apostolic letter of July 29, 1853, approved these recommendations and decreed accordingly. On November 1, 1853, Carrell was consecrated in Cincinnati by Archbishop John Baptist Purcell, assisted by Bishops Peter Paul Lefevere and John Henni.

The new diocese was an extensive one, bounded on the north by the Ohio River, on the south by Tennessee, on the east by Virginia, and on the west by the Kentucky River. It contained, at the time of Bishop Carrell's consecration, only ten churches and seven priests. The Bishop immediately commenced the erection of the Cathedral Church of St. Mary's, which in a year was ready for service. Churches and schools began to spring up in various parts of his diocese, and strides were rapidly made by religion and education during his administration. He introduced into the diocese the Sisters of the Poor of St. Francis, the Sisters of Charity of Nazareth, the monks and nuns of the Order of Saint Benedict, the Sisters of the Visitation, and the Ursuline Nuns.

The news of battle, carnage, and death during the Civil War deeply affected him, and he invariably requested his friends to spare him the pain of listening to them. His health, for some time before his death, began to fail. He was several times in danger of death from a complication of diseases under which he suffered. He died on September 25, 1868, at the age of 65, and was buried at the old St. Mary Cathedral in Covington. When the old cathedral was demolished, his remains were later moved to St. Mary Cemetery in Fort Mitchell, Kentucky.

References

External links
 Photo of Bishop Carrell

1803 births
1868 deaths
Roman Catholic bishops of Covington
19th-century American Jesuits
Clergy from Philadelphia